= Country Life Park =

- Location within Gauteng Location within South Africa
- Coordinates: 26.077°S 28.022°E
- Country: South Africa
- Province: Gauteng
- Municipality: City of Johannesburg
- Main Place: Sandton

Area
  - Total: 0.17 km^{2} (0.066 sq mi)

Population (2011)
  - Total: 579
  - Density: 3,400/km^{2} (8,800/sq mi)

Racial makeup (2011)
  - Black African: 25.3%
  - Coloured: 2.2%
  - Indian/Asian: 4.0%
  - White: 64.5%
  - Other: 4.0%

First languages (2011)
  - English: 73.0%
  - Afrikaans: 8.1%
  - Zulu: 3.5%
  - Tswana: 3.5%
  - Other: 11.9%
- Time zone: UTC+2 (SAST)
- PO box: 2060

Country Life Park is a suburb of Johannesburg, South Africa. It is located in Region B of the City of Johannesburg Metropolitan Municipality.
